Irfan Sadik (born 12 January 1999) is a Finnish professional footballer who plays for Mikkelin Palloilijat, as a striker.

Club career
On 13 January 2020, Sadik moved to Ykkönen club Mikkelin Palloilijat on a deal until the end of 2020.

Personal life 
Sadik's two older brothers, Berat and Burhan, are also footballers; the family are of Albanian descent.

References

External links

1999 births
Living people
Finnish footballers
FC Kuusysi players
FC Lahti players
Pallokerho Keski-Uusimaa players
Reipas Lahti players
Mikkelin Palloilijat players
Kakkonen players
Ykkönen players
Veikkausliiga players
Association football forwards
Finnish people of Albanian descent
People from Kiuruvesi
Sportspeople from North Savo